The Women's EuroHockey Junior Championship is a women's international under-21 field hockey tournament organized by the European Hockey Federation. The tournament has been held since 1977 and serves as a qualification tournament for the Women's FIH Hockey Junior World Cup.

The Women's EuroHockey Junior Championships consists of three levels. There is promotion and relegation between the three levels. The top two placed teams in the Championship II are promoted to the following year's Championship while the two lowest placed teams in the Championship are relegated to the following year's Championship II.

The highest level has been won by three different teams: the Netherlands has the most titles with ten, Germany has nine titles and Spain won their first and only title at the 2019 edition in Valencia, Spain.

Championship I

Results

Summary

* = hosts

Team appearances

Championship II

Results

Summary

* = hosts

Team appearances

Championship III

Results

Summary

* = hosts

Team appearances

See also
Men's EuroHockey Junior Championship
Women's EuroHockey Championship

Notes

References

 
Junior
EuroHockey Junior Championship
Hockey
EuroHockey Junior Championship
EuroHockey Junior Championship